Edgar Falch (2 November 1930 – 18 November 2013) was a Norwegian international football defender. Falch played for Viking his entire career where he played 139 league games and scored nine goals. He won the league with Viking in 1957–58 and the Cup in 1953 and 1959. Falch was capped 28 times for Norway.

Falch died in Stavanger in November 2013, aged 83. He was the grandfather of the goalkeeper Aslak Falch.

References

1930 births
2013 deaths
Sportspeople from Stavanger
Norwegian footballers
Norway international footballers
Viking FK players
Eliteserien players
Association football defenders